Gloma is a genus of flies in the family Empididae.

Species
G. fuscipennis Meigen, 1822
G. fuscipes Melander, 1945
 †G. hirta Loew, 1850
G. luctuosa Melander, 1928
G. pectinipes Melander, 1945

References

Empidoidea genera
Empididae